Bonatti is an Italian surname. Notable people with the surname include:

Fernando Bonatti (1894–1974), Italian gymnast
Guido Bonatti (died c. 1300), Italian astronomer
Matteo Bonatti (born 1981), former Italian footballer
Walter Bonatti (1930–2011), Italian mountain climber
 

Italian-language surnames